Doh-Vinci is a Hasbro arts and craft toy which combines Play-Doh with 3D printing. The kits include a soft form of Play-Doh, a 3-D styling tool and a base such as a vanity set for the children to decorate.  The Play-Doh comes in tubes which fit into the styling tool and are then extruded from a nozzle to make shapes in a similar manner to frosting cakes.  It is similar to the 3Doodler except uses Play-Doh instead of plastic.

See also
 Play-Doh
 3Doodler

References

External links
 Hasbro: DohVinci

Products introduced in 2014
Art and craft toys
Hasbro products
Hasbro brands
2010s toys
Clay toys